Osca is a genus of horse-flies in the tribe Scionini.

Species
Osca abdominosa (Philip, 1968)
Osca albithorax (Macquart, 1838)
Osca aureonigra Kröber, 1931
Osca aureopygia (Philip, 1968)
Osca collaris (Philippi, 1865)
Osca lata (Guerin, 1835)
Osca nigribella (Wilkerson, 1984)
Osca rubriventris Kröber, 1930
Osca rufa (Macquart, 1838)
Osca sublata (Philip, 1968)
Osca varia (Walker, 1848)

References

Tabanidae
Tabanoidea genera
Diptera of South America
Taxa named by Francis Walker (entomologist)